Parliamentary elections were held in Latvia on 3 and 4 October 1925. The Latvian Social Democratic Workers' Party remained the largest party, winning 32 of the 100 seats.

Electoral system
For the elections the country was divided into five constituencies, electing a total of 97 MPs using proportional representation. The three remaining seats were awarded to the parties with the highest vote totals that had failed to win a seat in any of the five constituencies.

The list system used was made flexible, as voters were able to cross out candidates' names and replace them with names from other lists. However, only 26.03% of voters made any changes to the lists. To register a list for the election parties needed only collect 100 signatures. A total of 141 lists were registered, although only 93 competed.

Results

References

Latvia
Parliamentary
Parliamentary elections in Latvia